Paracantha cultaris is a species of tephritid fruit fly found in western North America, as far south as Costa Rica. The adult is mainly orange-brown in color. The maggots can be found inside sunflowers and the adult flies are usually nearby the sunflowers.

References

Tephritinae
Insects described in 1894
Diptera of South America